The Federal Correctional Institution, Sandstone (FCI Sandstone) is a low-security United States federal prison for male offenders in Sandstone, Minnesota. It is operated by the Federal Bureau of Prisons (BoP), a division of the United States Department of Justice.

FCI Sandstone is located approximately 100 miles northeast of Minneapolis/St. Paul and 70 miles southwest of Duluth.

Notable Inmates (current and former)
†Inmates who were released from custody prior to 1982 are not listed on the Bureau of Prisons website.

Celebrities and sports figures

Political prisoners

Others

See also 

 List of U.S. federal prisons
 Federal Bureau of Prisons
 Incarceration in the United States

References

External links
 Homepage for the prison
 Map of BOP Prisons

Federal Correctional Institutions in the United States
Buildings and structures in Pine County, Minnesota
Prisons in Minnesota